The 1980 Special Honours in New Zealand was a Special Honours List, published on 1 August 1980, in which New Zealand's incoming governor-general was knighted.

Order of Saint Michael and Saint George

Knight Grand Cross (GCMG)
 The Honourable David Stuart Beattie – Governor-General (designate) of New Zealand.

References

Special honours
1980 awards